Earth Awakens is a science fiction novel by American writers Orson Scott Card and Aaron Johnston, and the third book of the First Formic Wars trilogy of novels in the Ender's Game series. It was released on June 10, 2014. It was nominated for the Goodreads Choice Award for science fiction.

Plot
With an alien invasion in progress in China, humanity is divided on how to defend itself. The Chinese government is determined to go it alone, despite suffering catastrophic losses. Captain Wit O'Toole of the Mobile Operations Police (MOP) and Mazer Rackham have managed to destroy one of the three alien landers, but because they achieved the first significant human victory of the war without official approval and using a nuclear warhead obtained without authorization, they are in the custody of Chinese General Sima. During the invasion, Mazer Rackham saves Bingwen, a very intelligent eight-year-old Chinese boy who now comes up with a clever ploy to get them released: he spreads word over the internet that they were acting under Sima's orders and gives Sima full credit.

Meanwhile, Victor Delgado and Imala Bootstamp drift to the alien mothership in a ship disguised to avoid being destroyed. Victor manages to enter and explore the vessel. They survive a failed drone attack on the alien ship and, after getting away again, confront Lem Jukes, whom they suspect of involvement in the attack. Actually, it was launched by Lem's father, Ukko. Lem tried to stop or delay it.

Based on what he has learned, Victor devises a plan to capture it, and reluctantly accepts Lem's help in carrying it out. The MOPs, including Wit and Mazer, are recruited to become the rest of Victor's boarding party. Despite Victor's objections, Imala volunteers as well.

When the Formics detect the intruders, all of their forces on Earth leave to go to their ship's defense. Lem leads a force to hold them off, resulting in a fierce space battle. Aboard the Mothership, Wit has to sacrifice his life, exposing himself to quickly lethal levels of radiation, but Victor's plan succeeds, and the ship is captured intact. However, Victor's cousin, Edimar, backtracks the path of the alien ship and discovers that it was only a scout ship; the real Mothership is reconfiguring itself into a battle fleet that will arrive in about five years.

See also

The Formic Wars: Silent Strike
List of Ender's Game characters
List of works by Orson Scott Card

References

Further reading
 Rising Shadow: Earth Awakens

External links

2014 American novels
2014 science fiction novels
American science fiction novels
Novels by Orson Scott Card
Alien invasions in novels
Space opera novels
Tor Books books